Milton Kym Mayes (born 23 April 1947) was an Australian politician who represented the South Australian House of Assembly seat of Unley from 1982 to 1993 for the Labor Party. He was a minister for various portfolios from 1985 to 1993.

References

 

1947 births
Living people
Members of the South Australian House of Assembly
Australian Labor Party members of the Parliament of South Australia